= Pike Pike Aye =

- ပိုက်ပိုက်အေး

Chief Justice of Tanintharyi Region
- Incumbent
- Assumed office 18 May 2020

Justice of Tanintharyi Region
- Incumbent
- Assumed office 29 January 2018

Personal details
- Born: Myanmar

Pike Pike Aye (Burmese: ပိုက်ပိုက်အေး) is the Chief Justice of the Supreme Court of Tanintharyi Region of Myanmar.

She previously served as a Justice at Supreme Court of Tanintharyi Region. At 29 January 2018, it was appointed .
